Lauhati Union is a union of Delduar Upazila, Tangail District, Bangladesh. It is situated at 23 km south of Tangail.

Demographics

According to Population Census 2011 performed by Bangladesh Bureau of Statistics, The total population of Lauhati union is 23959. There are 5725 households in total.

Education

The literacy rate of Lauhati Union is 43.4% (Male-47.1%, Female-40.1%).

See also
 Union Councils of Tangail District

References

Populated places in Dhaka Division
Populated places in Tangail District
Unions of Delduar Upazila